Shubert is a surname.

Shubert may also refer to:
 Shubert, Nebraska, U.S.
 Shubert Alley, a pedestrian alley in the Broadway theater district of New York City, New York, U.S.
 Shubert family, prominent in American theatre and founded the Shubert Organization
 The Shubert Organization, a theatrical producing organization and  major owner of theatres

See also
 Schubert (disambiguation)
 Shubert Theatre (disambiguation)